The Link is the second album released by the French metal band Gojira. A remastered edition of the album was released in 2005 by the band's former label, Listenable Records. The track "Indians" was released as a single.

In late September 2012, Listenable Records released the album in vinyl format, a strictly limited edition of 250 copies, available in two colors – black and red.

Track listing

Personnel 
Album personnel adapted from the CD liner notes of the 2005 re-release.

Gojira
 Joe Duplantier – vocals, rhythm guitar
 Christian Andreu – lead guitar
 Jean-Michel Labadie – bass
 Mario Duplantier – drums

Technical personnel
 Gabriel Editions – production
 Laurentx Etxemendi – engineering, mixing, mastering
 Joe Duplantier – mixing, artwork
 Jean-Michel Labadie – mixing

References 

2003 albums
Gojira (band) albums
Listenable Records albums